Bilba may be:

Bilba language
Jim Bilba
Bilba Labingi, the real Westron form of the name of the fictional character Bilbo Baggins